Carbidopa (Lodosyn) is a drug given to people with Parkinson's disease in order to inhibit peripheral metabolism of levodopa. This property is significant in that it allows a greater proportion of administered levodopa to cross the blood–brain barrier for central nervous system effect, instead of being peripherally metabolised into substances unable to cross said barrier.

Pharmacology 
Carbidopa inhibits aromatic-L-amino-acid decarboxylase (DOPA decarboxylase or DDC), an enzyme important in the biosynthesis of L-tryptophan to serotonin and in the biosynthesis of L-DOPA to dopamine (DA).  DDC exists both outside of (body periphery) and within the confines of the blood–brain barrier.

Carbidopa is used in the treatment of, among other diseases, Parkinson's disease (PD), a condition characterized by death of dopaminergic neurons in the substantia nigra. Increased dopamine availability may increase the effectiveness of the remaining neurons and alleviate symptoms for a time. The pharmacologic objective is to get an exogenous dopamine-precursor known as levodopa/L-DOPA into the dopamine-deficient brains of PD patients.  Levodopa/L-DOPA can cross the blood–brain barrier, but dopamine cannot.  The use of carbidopa seems counter-intuitive in Parkinson's disease (PD) in that it prevents DDC conversion of levodopa/L-DOPA to dopamine.  However, exogenously provided, levadopa/L-DOPA gets metabolized peripherally to its active metabolite dopamine before reaching the blood–brain barrier. Therefore, the PD brain, which is deficient in dopamine, will not receive as much of its prodrug precursor levodopa/L-DOPA due to peripheral DDC breakdown. However, carbidopa can decrease peripheral DDC conversion of levodopa/L-DOPA before it crosses the blood–brain barrier. Carbidopa acts as a peripheral DDC inhibitor, as carbidopa, itself, cannot cross the blood–brain barrier. In other words, carbidopa has no effect on brain DDC conversion of levodopa/L-DOPA to dopamine. Ultimately, a greater proportion of the exogenously provided levodopa/L-DOPA reaches the brain.  Commercially, carbidopa/levodopa combinations are available in the treatment of central dopamine deficiencies.

Along with carbidopa, other DDC inhibitors are benserazide (Ro-4-4602), difluromethyldopa, and α-methyldopa.

Pharmacology 2 

Carbidopa, an inhibitor of aromatic amino acid decarboxylation, is a white, crystalline compound, slightly soluble in water, with a molecular weight of 244.3. It is designated chemically as N-amino-α-methyl-3-hydroxy-L-tyrosine monohydrate. Its empirical formula is C10H14N2O4•H2O. Used in tandem with L-DOPA (also known as levodopa, a dopamine precursor converted in the body to dopamine), it increases the plasma half-life of levodopa from 50 minutes to 1½ hours. CarbiDOPA cannot cross the blood–brain barrier, so it inhibits only peripheral DDC. It thus prevents the conversion of L-DOPA to dopamine peripherally. This reduces the side effects caused by dopamine on the periphery, as well as increasing the concentration of L-DOPA and dopamine in the brain.

The combination of carbidopa/levodopa carries the brand names of Kinson, Sinemet, Pharmacopa and Atamet; while Stalevo is a combination with entacapone, which enhances the bioavailability of carbidopa and levodopa.

Carbidopa is most commonly used as a method to inhibit the activity of dopamine decarboxylase. This is an enzyme that breaks down L-Dopa in the periphery and converts it to dopamine. This results in the newly formed dopamine being unable to cross the blood–brain barrier and the effectiveness of L-Dopa treatments is greatly decreased. Carbidopa reduces the amount of levodopa required to produce a given response by about 75% and, when administered with levodopa, increases both plasma levels and the plasma half-life of levodopa, and decreases plasma and urinary dopamine and homovanillic acid. Elimination half-life of levodopa in the presence of carbidopa is about 1.5 hours. Following SINEMET CR, the apparent half-life of levodopa may be prolonged because of continuous absorption. This is extremely useful in the treatment of Parkinsons disease symptoms because the amount of levodopa administered to the patient can be greatly reduced. This reduction in dosage is extremely useful due to the side effects that may occur from an overdose of L-Dopa within the body.

Carbidopa is also used in combination with 5-HTP, a naturally occurring amino acid which is a precursor to the neurotransmitter serotonin and an intermediate in tryptophan metabolism.  carbidopa, which is used in PD to prevent conversion of the levodopa to dopamine, prevents 5-Hydroxytryptophan’s (5-HTP) metabolism in the liver and causes decreased levels of serotonin
in the blood. Research shows that co-administration of 5-HTP and carbidopa greatly increases plasma 5-HTP levels. Several cases of scleroderma-like illness have been reported in patients using carbidopa and 5-HTP. In Europe, 5-HTP is prescribed with carbidopa to prevent the conversion of 5-HTP into serotonin until it reaches the brain.

Synthesis 

The synthesis begins with a modified Strecker reaction using hydrazine and potassium cyanide on arylacetone (1) to give 2. This is then hydrolyzed with cold HCl to give carboxamide 3. More vigorous hydrolysis with 48% HBr cleaves the amide bond and the aryl ether group to produce carbidopa (4).

References

External links 
 Lodosyn prescribing information
 Sinemet datasheet for New Zealand

Catecholamines
Hydrazines
Aromatic L-amino acid decarboxylase inhibitors
Antiparkinsonian agents
Peripherally selective drugs